Eston is a town in the Rural Municipality of Snipe Lake No. 259, Saskatchewan, Canada. The population was 1061 at the 2016 Census.

Demographics 

Climate
Eston experiences a semi-arid climate (Köppen climate classification BSk) with long, cold, dry winters and short but very warm summers. Precipitation is very low, with an annual average of 297mm, and is heavily concentrated in the warmer months.

The town experienced "severe damage" to buildings as a result of plough winds during a severe thunderstorm on July 14, 2019.

Notable people
 Michael Helm, author
 Robert Steadward, founder of the International Paralympic Committee

See also 
 List of towns in Saskatchewan
 List of communities in Saskatchewan
 Eston Airport

References

External links

Towns in Saskatchewan